Tembhapuri Dam, is an earthfill dam on Nagzari river near Aurangabad in the state of Maharashtra in India. It is a tourist attraction in the monsoon season as it is really near to the  Aurangabad city.

Specifications

Purpose
 Irrigation

See also
 Dams in Maharashtra
 List of reservoirs and dams in India

References

Dams in Aurangabad district, Maharashtra
Dams completed in 1994
1994 establishments in Maharashtra